Annie Wall may refer to:

 Annie Wall Barnett (1859–1942), American writer, litterateur, poet
 Annie Russell Wall (1835–1920), American historian and writer